The 1969–70 WHL season was the 18th season of the Western Hockey League. Seven teams played a 74-game schedule, and the Vancouver Canucks were the Lester Patrick Cup champions, defeating the Portland Buckaroos four games to one in the final series. The Salt Lake Golden Eagles joined the WHL as seventh team.

Final standings 

bold - qualified for playoffs

Playoffs 

The Vancouver Canucks defeated the Portland Buckaroos 4 games to 1 to win the Lester Patrick Cup.

References

Western Hockey League (1952–1974) seasons
1969–70 in American ice hockey by league
1969–70 in Canadian ice hockey by league